Nagrota is a town located in the Jammu district of Jammu and Kashmir  in India. It is located on National highway 44 between Jammu city and Udhampur. It is situated on the bank of River Tawi. Nagrota along with Kashmiri Pandit Migrant town of Jagti straddle the national highway. Nagrota is the first shrine stoppage for Shri Mata Vaishno Devi. The Kol-Kandoli temple is a mandate for completing the Shri Mata Vaishno Devi pilgrimage. Nagrota has an extension of Jammu Industries having Oil Depots and Godowns.It serves as headquarter of the XVI Corps (India) also known as the 'White Knight Corp'.

Though Nagrota does not have a railway station, it does have a Railway Station Code assigned (NGRT) in preparation for the completion of the planned Jammu-Srinagar railway extension.

Nagrota is also home to prestigious Sainik School and an I.I.T College, Sainik School Nagrota and Indian Institute of Technology, Jammu. It has a magnificent army park named as Vijay Park. Nagrota has a National Rural Health Mission and a KNH Hospital which is under stay. Nowadays, the progress of Nagrota is in its top level. It has a witnessed a Khel Gaun and a volleyball stadium. The Jamboo Zoo in Nagrota which is under construction with more than 2000 varieties of snakes.

Nagrota has a humid subtropical climate (Köppen Cfa), much cooler than what is found in much of the rest of India, due to its moderately high elevation and northerly position. The valley is surrounded by the Himalayas on all sides. Winters are cool, with daytime temperature averaging 12°-15 °C. Summers are warm with a July daytime average of 24.1 °C (75.4 °F). The average annual rainfall is around 720 millimetres (28 in). Spring is the wettest season while autumn is the driest. The highest temperature reliably recorded is 38.3 °C (100.9 °F) and the lowest is −20.0 °C (−4.0 °F).[30]

Geography
Nagrota is about 14 km ahead of Jammu city on NH44.The town is located on uneven low valleys in the Trikuta hills on one side and river Tawi on the other side. Nagrota has an average elevation of 412 m above sea level.

Demographics
As of 2011, Nagrota had a population of 19,998 while the twin town of Jagti, made for Kashmiri migrants, had a population of around 14,000-18000. Jagti township has total of 176 buildings with 24 flats in each building. Jagti township has a total of 4224 flats.

Religion
Hindu 89.30%, Sikh 4.39%, Muslim 5.31%.

Cantonment and 16 Corps 
There is a large Nagrota Cantonment located in Nagrota, which is the home of 16 Corps, the largest Corps in the Indian Army and also world's largest corp. A Military Police checkpost is located at the entry point.cantonment.

See also
 Jammu
 Jammu tavi
 Talab Tillo
 Samba, Jammu
 Kathua
 Jammu Cantonment
 Hiranagar
 Akhnoor

References

Jammu Division
Cantonments of India